Kusuda (written: 楠田 lit. "camphor tree field") is a Japanese surname. Notable people with the surname include:

, Japanese voice actress and singer
, Japanese politician
, Japanese basketball player
Yuri Kusuda, American canoe slalomist

Japanese-language surnames